Welton David Becket (August 8, 1902 – January 16, 1969) was an American modern architect who designed many buildings in Los Angeles, California.

Biography
Becket was born in Seattle, Washington and graduated from the University of Washington program in Architecture in 1927 with a Bachelor of Architecture degree (B.Arch.).

He moved to Los Angeles in 1933 and formed a partnership with his University of Washington classmate Walter Wurdeman and Angelean architect Charles F. Plummer.  Their first major commission was the Pan-Pacific Auditorium in 1935, which won them residential jobs from James Cagney, Robert Montgomery, and other film celebrities.  Plummer died in 1939.

The successor firm Wurdeman and Becket went on to design Bullock's Pasadena (1944) and a couple of corporate headquarters.  Wurdeman and Becket developed the concept of "total design," whereby their firm would be responsible for master planning, engineering, interiors, furniture, fixtures, landscaping, signage, and even (in the case of restaurants) menus, silverware, matchbooks, and napkins.

After Wurdeman's death in 1949, Becket formed Welton Becket and Associates and continued to grow the firm to the extent that it was one of the largest architectural offices in the world by the time of his death in 1969. In 1987, his firm was acquired by Ellerbe Associates, and the merged firm continued as Ellerbe Becket until the end of 2009, when it was acquired by AECOM. It is now known as Ellerbe Becket, an AECOM Company.

Becket's buildings used unusual facade materials such as ceramic tile and stainless steel grillwork, repetitive geometric patterns, and a heavy emphasis on walls clad in natural stone, particularly travertine and flagstone.

With The Walt Disney Company and the United States Steel Corporation, Becket's firm co-designed Disney's Contemporary Resort, which opened in 1971 at Walt Disney World Resort. The Contemporary was designed as a 14-story steel A-frame with a monorail running through the building. Modular guest rooms were assembled, finished, furnished, fully equipped and their doors locked, on the ground, then lifted by crane and inserted into the frame; however, this sometimes took multiple tries.

Welton Becket was elected a Fellow of the American Institute of Architects in 1952.

Becket's sons, Welton MacDonald Becket & Bruce Becket, are also practicing architects, as well as his nephew MacDonald G. Becket and granddaughter Alexandra Becket.

Commissions

Becket's extensive list of credits includes:

777 Main Street, Hartford Connecticut
Pan-Pacific Auditorium, Los Angeles, CA, 1935 (with Walter Wurdeman) (destroyed by fire)
 Jones Dog & Cat Hospital, West Hollywood, California, 1938 (with Walter Wurdeman)
Manila Jai Alai Building, Manila, Philippines, 1939 (with Walter Wurdeman) (demolished)
General Petroleum Building, Los Angeles, CA, 1949 (with Walter Wurdeman)
First National Bank of Arizona Building, Phoenix, AZ, 1950
Welton Becket Residence, Los Angeles, CA, 1952
Los Altos Center Mall, Long Beach, CA 1953
Ronald Reagan UCLA Medical Center, Los Angeles, CA, 1953
Baptist Memorial Hospital, Kansas City, MO, 1953 
Parker Center (formerly the Police Administration Building), Los Angeles, CA, 1955 (demolished)
The Broadway department store (now Walmart) at Panorama City Shopping Center, Panorama City, Los Angeles, CA, 1955
The Beverly Hilton, Beverly Hills, CA, 1955
The Broadway Orange County, at the original Anaheim Plaza, Anaheim, CA, 1955 (demolished)
Capitol Records Building, Los Angeles, CA, Project Designer Lou Naidorf, 1956
Edens Plaza, Wilmette, Illinois, 1956
Park Central Mall, Phoenix, AZ, 1956
Ace Hotel Los Angeles (formerly the Texaco Building) on Wilshire Boulevard, Los Angeles, CA, 1957
Santa Monica Civic Auditorium, Santa Monica, CA, 1958
Hotel Tryp Habana Libre (formerly the Habana Hilton), Havana, Cuba, 1958
The Nile Ritz-Carlton, Cairo (formerly the Nile Hilton), Cairo, Egypt, 1959 (with Mahmoud Riad)
Sheraton Dallas Hotel (formerly the Adams Mark Dallas and Southland Center), Dallas, TX, 1959
Los Angeles Memorial Sports Arena, Los Angeles, CA, 1959 (demolished)
Riviera Hotel and Casino expansion, Las Vegas, NV, 1959 (demolished)
Los Angeles Customs House and Federal Office Building, Los Angeles, CA, 1960 (with Albert C. Martin and Paul R. Williams)
100 California Street, San Francisco, CA, 1960
Kaiser Center, Oakland, CA, 1960
Clark County Courthouse, Las Vegas, NV, 1961 (with Zick & Sharp)
Grossmont Center, La Mesa, CA, 1961
Christown Mall, Phoenix, AZ, 1961
Robert McCulloch Residence, Palm Springs, CA, 1962
Petersen Automotive Museum (formerly a Seibu and Ohrbach's department store), Los Angeles, CA, 1962
Walt Whitman Shops, Huntington Station, NY, 1962
Southern Cross Hotel, Melbourne, Australia, 1962 (demolished 2003)
Interiors of the new Los Angeles International Airport, 1962 
McCulloch Building (now Homewood Suites by Hilton LAX) Los Angeles, CA, 1962 
Airport Marina Hotel, Westchester, Los Angeles, 1961-2 (now Hotel June)
Security First National Bank, Los Angeles, CA, 1963 (demolished)
U.S. Embassy, Warsaw, Poland, 1963
Cinerama Dome, Los Angeles, CA, 1963
Century City (masterplan), Los Angeles, CA, 1963
Gateway West Building, Century City, Los Angeles, CA, 1963
Biltmore Fashion Park, Phoenix, AZ, 1963
Hartford National Bank, Hartford, CT 1963
ExxonMobil Building (formerly Humble Oil Building) Houston, TX, 1963
McCarran International Airport, Las Vegas, NV, 1963
Orange Civic Center, Orange, CA, 1963
Westfield Century City (formally Century City Mall) Century City, Los Angeles, CA, 1964
Phillips Petroleum Building, Bartlesville, OK, 1964
Federal Building, Los Angeles, CA, 1964
North American Avaition Building, Los Angeles, 1964
Los Angeles Music Center (officially the Performing Arts Center of Los Angeles County), which includes Dorthy Chandler Pavilion, Mark Taper Forum and Ahmanson Theater, Los Angeles, CA, 1964
Ford Pavilion, New York City, NY, 1964 (demolished)
General Electric Pavilion, New York City, NY, 1964 (demolished)
Mutual Savings and Loan Building, Pasadena, CA, 1964
Pauley Pavilion at UCLA (officially the Edwin W. Pauley Pavilion), Los Angeles, CA, 1965
Airport Center Building (now Hyatt Place LAX / Century Blvd) Los Angeles, CA, 1965
Santa Monica Shores Apartments, Santa Monica CA, 1967
Gulf Life Tower (now known as the Riverplace Tower), Jacksonville, FL, 1967
Xerox Tower, Rochester, New York, 1967
Fashion Island, Newport Beach, CA, 1967 (with William Pereira)
5900 Wilshire, Los Angeles, CA, 1968 (with William Pereira)
La Habra Fashion Square, La Habra, CA, 1968 (Welton Becket and Associates)
City Hall, Pomona, CA, Project Designer Marvin Taff, 1969
Equitable Life Building, Los Angeles, 1969
McKesson Plaza, San Francisco, CA, 1969
One California, San Francisco, CA, 1969
Park Plaza Shopping Center, Oshkosh, WI, 1969
800 Wilshire, Los Angeles, CA, 1970
Park Plaza Mall, Oshkosh, WI, 1970, now City Center a commercial business center for Oshkosh.
PNC Plaza (formerly the Citizens Fidelity Plaza), Louisville, KY, 1971
Beverly Wilshire Hotel expansion, Beverly Hills, CA, 1971
Disney's Contemporary Resort, Lake Buena Vista, FL, 1971
Worcester Center, Worcester, MA, 1971
Chase Tower (formerly the Bank One Center and Valley Bank Center), Phoenix, AZ, Project Designer MacDonald Becket, 1972
Grand Ole Opry House, Nashville, TN, 1972
Hyatt Regency, Knoxville,  TN, 1972
Nassau Veterans Memorial Coliseum, Uniondale, New York, 1972
One Market Plaza, San Francisco, CA, 1972
Union Bank Building, San Francisco, CA, 1972
One PNC Plaza, Pittsburgh, PA, 1972
Regions Center (formerly the AmSouth Center, AmSouth-Sonat Tower, and First National-Southern Natural Building), Birmingham, AL, 1972
Brady Sullivan Plaza,  (formerly Hampshire Plaza), Manchester, N.H., 1973
Glendale Central Library, Glendale, CA, Project Designer, Marvin Taff, 1973
Chase Plaza, Lexington, KY, 1973
100 Summer Street, Boston, MA, 1974
United Plaza, Philadelphia, PA, 1974
Hyatt Regency New Orleans, New Orleans, LA, 1976
Intourist Hotel, Moscow, Russia, 1976
Reunion Tower, Dallas, TX, 1978
Hyatt Regency Hotel, Dallas, TX, 1978
Hyatt Regency Hotel, Washington, D. C. 1978
Hyatt Regency Hotel, Louisville, KY, 1978
US Bank Plaza, Boise, ID, 1978
BNY Mellon Center, Pittsburgh, PA, 1980
One Tampa City Center (formerly the GTE Building) Tampa, FL, 1981
Stanton Tower, El Paso, TX, 1981
Wells Fargo Plaza, San Diego, CA, 1983
OneOK Plaza, Tulsa, OK, 1984 (with HKS, Inc.)
First Bank and Trust Tower, New Orleans, LA, 1987
Skyview Center, Los Angeles, CA, 1987

References

External links

Oral history — Perkins quote (pg. 75)
Bigfloridacountry.com: Video clip of construction of the Contemporary Resort
Bigfloridacountry.com:  Contemporary Pictures
MacDonald Becket papers, Welton Becket and Associates, Getty Research Institute, Los Angeles, Accession No. 2012.M.43
Welton Becket architectural drawings and photographs, Getty Research Institute, Los Angeles, Accession No. 2010.M.83

 
Architects from Los Angeles
Modernist architects
Fellows of the American Institute of Architects
1902 births
1969 deaths
Architects from Seattle
University of Washington College of Built Environments alumni
20th-century American architects